Uchte is a municipality in Lower Saxony, Germany.

Uchte may also refer to:
Uchte (Samtgemeinde), a Samtgemeinde ("collective municipality") in Lower Saxony, Germany, its seat is the municipality Uchte
Uchte (Biese), a river of Saxony-Anhalt, tributary of the Biese